This is a list of hospitals in Austria.

Graz
Geriatrisches Krankenhaus der Stadt Graz
Landeskrankenhaus Graz West
Landeskrankenhaus (LKH) - Universitätsklinikum Graz
Landesnervenklinik Sigmund Freud
Krankenhaus der Barmherzigen Brüder Eggenberg
Krankenhaus der Barmherzigen Brüder Graz
Krankenhaus der Elisabethinen
Unfallkrankenhaus Graz

Linz/Upper Austria
Allgemein öffentliches Krankenhaus der Elisabethinen
Allgemein öffentliches Krankenhaus der Stadt Linz (AKH Linz) - Upper Austria
Konventhospital Barmherzigen Brüder Linz
Krankenhaus der Barmherzigen Schwestern
Landesfrauen- und -kinderklinik (LKKF)
Landesnervenklinik Wagner Jauregg
Unfallkrankenhaus Linz (UKH Linz)
Klinikum Grieskirchen-Wels (Wels)
Klinikum Grieskirchen-Wels (Grieskirchen)

Vienna
Donauspital
Hanuschkrankenhaus
Lorenz-Böhler-Krankenhaus
Privatklinik Dobling
Privatklinik Josephstadt
Rudolfinerhaus
Sozialmedizinisches Zentrum Ost
Steinhof
Stem Cell Therapy Group Vienna
Unfallkrankenhaus Meidling
Vienna General Hospital (Allgemeines Krankenhaus, AKH)
Wiener Privatklinik
Wilhelminenspital

Vorarlberg
Landeskrankenhaus Feldkirch
Landeskrankenhaus Bregenz
Landeskrankenhaus Bludenz
Krankenhaus der Stadt Dornbirn
Landeskrankenhaus Hohenems
Krankenhaus der Stiftung Maria Ebene, Frastanz

Others
General Hospital Kirchdorf - Kirchdorf
Krankenhaus St.Josef - Braunau am Inn
Landeskrankenhaus Vöcklabruck
Landeskrankenhaus Zwettl - Zwettl
Moorheilbad - Harbach (Austria)
Privatklinik Althofen - Carinthia
Universitätsklinik Innsbruck

References

Austria
Hospitals

Hospitals
Austria